Andabeløya or Andabeløyna is a populated island in Flekkefjord municipality in Agder county, Norway.  The  island lies at the mouth of the Fedafjorden, just east of the island of Hidra.  The one village on the island is called Andabeløy.

The island is very mountainous and rugged. All the island's population lives in the village of Andabeløy, located at the relatively flat northern end of the island.  In 2015, there were about 100 residents living on the island. The island is connected to the mainland by a ferry at the north end of the island.

See also
List of islands of Norway

References

External links
Webcam

Flekkefjord
Islands of Agder
Villages in Agder